Mohammadabad-e Arab (also Romanized as Moḩammadābād-e ‘Arab; also known as Moḩammadābād, Moḩammadābād-e ‘Arabhā, and Muhammadābād) is a village in Behnamarab-e Jonubi Rural District of Javadabad District of Varamin County, Tehran province, Iran. At the 2006 National Census, its population was 2,078 in 500 households. The following census in 2011 counted 1,941 people in 499 households. The latest census in 2016 showed a population of 1,965 people in 581 households; it was the largest village in its rural district.

References 

Varamin County

Populated places in Tehran Province

Populated places in Varamin County